Branka Stamenković (born 1968) is a Serbian politician. She served in the National Assembly of Serbia from 2016 to 2020 as a member of the Enough is Enough (Dosta je bilo, DJB) political movement, which she led on an interim basis from November 2018 to October 2019. She was later the candidate of the DJB-led Sovereignists coalition in the 2022 Serbian presidential election.

Early life and career
Stamenković was born in Belgrade, in what was then the Socialist Republic of Serbia in the Socialist Federal Republic of Yugoslavia. She is a professional translator in the fields of popular psychology and astrology and has herself worked as an astrologer. Her official biography indicates that she studied at the Sophia Centre for the Study of Cosmology in Culture and the University of Wales Trinity Saint David in the United Kingdom. Some aspects of her academic record have been questioned, including her claim that she took post-graduate studies at the latter institution. Stamenković also launched the "Mother's Courage" initiative to improve conditions in Serbian maternity hospitals.

Politician
Stamenković joined DJB on its founding in 2014, when the movement was generally considered as liberal and reformist. She was given the tenth position on its electoral list in the 2014 Serbian parliamentary election and the eighth position on its list in the concurrent 2014 Belgrade City Assembly election. The movement did not cross the electoral threshold to win representation at either level.

Parliamentarian
Stamenković received the thirteenth position on DJB's list in the 2016 parliamentary election and was this time elected when the list won sixteen mandates. The Serbian Progressive Party (Srpska napredna stranka, SNS) and its allies won the election, and DJB served in opposition. Stamenković was a member of the assembly's health and family committee and the committee on administrative, budgetary, mandate, and immunity issues; a deputy member of the committee on the rights of the child; and a member of the parliamentary friendship groups with Australia, Canada, the Czech Republic, Denmark, Norway, South Africa, Sweden, Turkey, the United Kingdom, and the United States of America.

She also received the fourth position on DJB's list for New Belgrade in the 2016 Serbian local elections and was elected to the municipal assembly when the list won five seats.

The DJB movement experienced significant internal divisions from 2016 to 2018, during which time some delegates resigned to sit as independents. The movement ran a combined electoral list with the hard-right party Dveri in the 2018 Belgrade City Assembly election. Stamenković appeared in the twenty-seventh position; the list did not cross the electoral threshold. The DJB movement itself shifted to the radical right after this election, leading to more resignations. By November 2018, Stamenković and former leader Saša Radulović were the movement's only remaining members in the assembly. 

On 8 November 2018, DJB's main board dismissed Branislav Mihajlović as leader and named Stamenković to the role on an interim basis. She also took on new responsibilities for the party in the assembly at this time. In addition to her existing committee assignments, she became a member of the committee for culture and information; a member of the committee on labour, social affairs, social inclusion, and poverty reduction; a member of the committee for European integration; a deputy member of the committee on human and minority rights and gender equality; and a deputy member of the committee for environmental protection. This was a short-term arrangement; by July 2019, she was not listed as having any committee responsibilities.

In late 2018, Stamenković was appointed as one of the Serbian assembly's representatives to the Parliamentary Assembly of the Council of Europe (PACE) and to the Francophonie (where Serbia has associate status). She served in the PACE as a member of the European Conservatives Group (renamed as the European Conservatives Group and Democratic Alliance in May 2019) and was a full member of the committee on migration, refugees, and displaced persons; a full member of the sub-committees on diasporas and integration (which were merged into a single committee in January 2020); a member of the PACE monitoring committee; and an alternate member of the committee on equality and non-discrimination.

Saša Radulović was considered as the DJB movement's de facto leader while Stamenković was interim president, and he was formally re-elected as leader at an assembly held on 19 October 2019. At this event, Stemanković said that she had sought to stabilize the movement over the previous year and had urged Radulović to run for the leadership again.

The DJB movement contested the 2020 Serbian parliamentary election at the head of the Sovereigntists coalition, and Stamenković appeared in the second position on its list, which did not cross the electoral threshold. The coalition did not contest the municipal election in New Belgrade in the concurrent 2020 Serbian local elections.

Presidential candidate
Stamenković was the candidate of the Sovereigntists coalition in the 2022 Serbian presidential election. During the campaign, she highlighted the movement's opposition to membership in the European Union. She also argued for the abolition of health cards and objected to media descriptions of the DJB movement as anti-vaccination. She received about two per cent of the vote, finishing seventh in a field of eight candidates. 

She appeared in the third position on the Sovereigntists list in the concurrent 2022 Serbian parliamentary election and the thirty-eighth position on its list in the 2022 Belgrade City Assembly election. The coalition did not cross the electoral threshold at either level.

Electoral record

Serbia (President of Serbia)

References

1968 births
Living people
Politicians from Belgrade
Members of the National Assembly (Serbia)
Members of the Parliamentary Assembly of the Council of Europe
Members of the Parliamentary Assembly of the Francophonie
Enough is Enough (party) politicians
European Conservatives Group and Democratic Alliance politicians
Candidates for President of Serbia